Tempo, historically called Tempodeshel, is a small village at the foot of Brougher Mountain in County Fermanagh, Northern Ireland. The Census of 2011 recorded a population of 489 people. It lies within the Fermanagh and Omagh District Council area.

History
The name An tIompú Deiseal ("the right-hand turn") may refer to a bend in the Tempo River near the village. There is a local legend that Saint Patrick left a manuscript here on his way to Enniskillen and that he told his servant to "turn right" to go back and retrieve it.

On 25 October 1920, during the Irish War of Independence, the Irish Republican Army (IRA) raided the Royal Irish Constabulary barracks in Tempo for weapons. RIC sergeant Samuel Lucas was shot and fatally wounded, but a group of armed Ulster Volunteers arrived and drove off the IRA unit. Shortly after, a Catholic civilian with republican sympathies, Philip Breen, was shot in the doorway of his family's pub in the village and later died of his wounds.

Tempo is the birthplace of Young Irelander Terence MacManus, one of the leaders of the 1848 Rebellion.

Education
Schools and pre-schools serving the area include Tempo Controlled Primary School, St. Mary's Primary School and the Tempo Community Playgroup.

Places of interest

Campbell's Bar is the oldest public house in the town and is known for its reported supernatural sightings. The Fermanagh News reported the bar as the most haunted place in Fermanagh in 1994.

2001 Census
Tempo is classified as a small village or hamlet by the NI Statistics and Research Agency (NISRA) (i.e. with population between 500 and 1,000 people).
On Census day (29 April 2001) there were 533 people living in Tempo. Of these:
23.2% were aged under 16 years and 21.5% were aged 60 and over
48.2% of the population were male and 51.8% were female
69.0% were from a Catholic background and 30.4% were from a Protestant background
5.7% of people aged 16–74 were unemployed

For more details see: NI Neighbourhood Information Service

See also
 List of towns and villages in Northern Ireland

References

Sources
 Enniskillen.com
 Culture Northern Ireland

Villages in County Fermanagh